Yimmi Javier Chará Zamora (born April 2, 1991) is a Colombian professional footballer who plays as a winger for Major League Soccer club Portland Timbers and the Colombia national team.

Club career
On December 17, 2014, Rayados de Monterrey signed Chará from Deportes Tolima. He was the fifth Colombian in the present tournament joining his compatriots Stefan Medina, Dorlan Pabon as well as Alexander Mejía and Edwin Cardona who just joined the team.
In June 2015 Chará was loaned to Atlético Nacional where they became League Champions. Atlético Nacional wanted to extend Chará's contract but on December 17, 2015, Dorados de Sinaloa agreed to signed Chará in a 6-month loan deal from Monterrey.

Atlético Junior
In July 2017, Chará signed for Atlético Junior. He scored 13 goals in 28 games in his first season at Barranquilla, helping Junior win the 2017 Copa Colombia.

Atlético Mineiro
On June 12, 2018, Chará joined Brazilian club Atlético Mineiro on a five-year contract for a reported fee of €5 million.

Portland Timbers
On January 2, 2020, Chará joined MLS club Portland Timbers as a Designated Player. It was the first time since his brother Diego left Deportes Tolima in 2011 that they had been at the same club.

International career
On October 3, 2014, Chará was called up to the Colombian senior team, for the first time, by manager José Néstor Pekerman for the team's friendlies against El Salvador and Canada. On August 31, 2017, Chará made his official debut with Colombia playing an away game against Venezuela. On his third match with the Colombian senior team against Paraguay, he assisted and quickly became a more important player for the Colombian senior team.

In May 2018, he was named in Colombia's preliminary 35-man squad for the 2018 World Cup in Russia. However, he did not make the final cut to 23.

Career statistics

Club

International

Scores and results list Colombia's goal tally first.

Personal life
Chará's two brothers are also professional football players. Luis Felipe plays for Mineros de Guayana of the Venezuelan Primera División and Diego for the Portland Timbers of Major League Soccer.

Honours
Deportes Tolima
Copa Colombia: 2014

Atlético Nacional
Primera A: 2015–II

Junior
Copa Colombia: 2017

References

External links
 
 
 
 

1991 births
Living people
Colombian footballers
Colombian expatriate footballers
Colombia international footballers
Colombian expatriate sportspeople in Mexico
Expatriate footballers in Mexico
Colombian expatriate sportspeople in Brazil
Expatriate footballers in Brazil
Colombian expatriate sportspeople in the United States
Expatriate soccer players in the United States
Categoría Primera A players
Liga MX players
Centauros Villavicencio footballers
Deportes Tolima footballers
C.F. Monterrey players
Dorados de Sinaloa footballers
Atlético Nacional footballers
Clube Atlético Mineiro players
Footballers from Cali
Association football forwards
Portland Timbers players
Designated Players (MLS)
Major League Soccer players
Portland Timbers 2 players
USL Championship players
2021 Copa América players